Henri Collomb (1913–1979) was a French psychiatrist.

1913 births
1979 deaths
French psychiatrists
20th-century French physicians